ESW can mean:
 Engineers for a Sustainable World, a national not-for-profit based in Pittsburgh, Pennsylvania
 Empire State Wrestling, an independent wrestling promotion that has operated in Western New York State since 2002
 Embedded software, computer software that plays an integral role in the electronics it is supplied with
 Electroslag welding, a single pass welding process.
 Every Single Word, a YouTube channel and Tumblr blog dealing with POC representation in media
 Eswatini (FIFA and IOC code: ESW), southern African country formerly known as Swaziland